Six ships of the Royal Navy have been named HMS Foxhound. A seventh was planned but never completed:

 was an 18-gun  launched in 1806. She foundered in 1809 in the Atlantic.
 was a 16-gun sloop, originally the French Navy's brig Basque. She was captured in 1809 and sold in 1816. She then became a whaler, making some 10-11 whaling voyages between 1817 and 1848.
HMS Foxhound was to have been a 10-gun . She was ordered in 1826 but cancelled in 1831.
 was a screw gunboat launched in 1856 and broken up in 1866.
 was a 4-gun screw gunboat launched in 1877. She was transferred to the Coastguard in 1886, became a coal yug and was renamed YC 20 in 1897, was sold in 1920 and finally broken up in 1975.
 was a  launched in 1909 and sold in 1921.
 was an F-class destroyer launched in 1934, transferred to the Royal Canadian Navy in 1944 and renamed HMCS Qu'appelle, and sold in 1948.

References

Royal Navy ship names